Warren Richard Renick (born March 16, 1944) is a retired American professional baseball player, manager and coach. Renick had a 14-year (1965–1978) professional playing career, including all or part of five seasons (1968–1972) in Major League Baseball as a third baseman, left fielder and shortstop for the Minnesota Twins.

Playing career
Renick graduated from Madison South High School in his hometown of London, Ohio, attended Ohio State University, and signed with the Twins in 1964, the year before the institution of the Major League Baseball Draft. In , he was recalled from Triple-A Denver in midyear, and in his debut major league at bat on July 11, he homered off Mickey Lolich, ace left-hander of the Detroit Tigers. The blow helped Minnesota win the game, 5–4. Renick started in 30 games at shortstop during the season's final three months.

Overall, he batted .221 lifetime with 122 career hits, 42 of them for extra bases. In the field, he appeared in 71 games (65 games started) at third base, 63 games (37 starts) in the outfield, and 48 games (33) at shortstop. Although Minnesota sent him to the minor leagues at the end of the  season, Renick continued his active career through 1978, playing his final two seasons in the Montreal Expos' organization.

Coach and manager
In 1979, Renick began his coaching and managing career, starting as a minor league batting instructor in the Kansas City Royals' system. He also managed in the high minors for the Expos and Chicago White Sox; as skipper of the Triple-A Nashville Sounds, Renick was named American Association Manager of the Year in 1993 and 1996.

References

External links

Pura Pelota (Venezuelan Winter League)

1944 births
Living people
Baseball players from Ohio
Denver Bears players
Florida Instructional League Red Sox players
Florida Instructional League Twins players
Florida Marlins coaches
Kansas City Royals coaches
Major League Baseball bench coaches
Major League Baseball hitting coaches
Major League Baseball infielders
Major League Baseball outfielders
Major League Baseball third base coaches
Minnesota Twins coaches
Minnesota Twins players
Montreal Expos coaches
Nashville Sounds managers
Navegantes del Magallanes players
American expatriate baseball players in Venezuela
Ohio State Buckeyes baseball players
Ohio State University alumni
Orlando Twins players
People from London, Ohio
Pittsburgh Pirates coaches
Tacoma Twins players
Wilson Tobs players